Jean Claude Mbanya is a Cameroonian professor of medicine and endocrinology. He is the Dean Doctoral School of Life, Health and Environmental Sciences at the  University of Yaoundé 1. He is a fellow of the African Academy of Sciences, the World Academy of Sciences and the Royal College of Physicians. He was a former President and currently the honorary leader of the International Diabetes Federation (IDF).

Education 
Mbanya obtained his medical degree from the University of Yaoundé in 1979. He received his PhD and MRCP from  University of Newcastle upon Tyne. In 2011, he received a Doctor Philosophiae honoris causa from the University of Oslo for his contributions to the cause of diabetes.

Career 
Although Mbanya was awarded a scholarship to study chemical engineering at the formative part of his career, he was motivated to become a doctor by his father who had diabetes. He is a professor of medicine and endocrinology, the Postgraduate Dean of the Doctoral School of Life, Health and Environmental Sciences at the University of Yaoundé, and a Consultant Physician and Director of the National Obesity Centre at the University Teaching Hospital in Yaoundé.

Research interests 
Mbanya focused on epidemiology of non-communicable diseases which includes diabetes and its complications, ethno-pharmacology, molecular biology of diabetes, hypertension, thyroid diseases and their implications on the health care systems of developing countries.

Membership and fellowship 
 Mbanya is a fellow of African Academy of Sciences, the World Academy of Sciences, Royal College of Physicians and Cameroon Academy of Sciences.

Awards 
In 2004, he received the American Diabetes Association Harold Rifkin Award for his international contributions to the cause of Diabetes and in  2009 he was also given the Philip Sherlock Award of the University Outreach Diabetes Group, Jamaica.

Selected publications 
 Dorairaj Prabhakaran, Shuchi Anand, David Watkins, Thomas Gaziano, Yangfeng Wu, Jean Claude Mbanya, Rachel Nugent: Cardiovascular, Respiratory, and Related Disorders: Key Messages on Essential Interventions to Address its Burden in Low-and Middle-Income Countries
 Prabhakaran, Dorairaj; Anand, Shuchi; Gaziano, Thomas A.; Mbanya, Jean-Claude; Wu, Yangfeng; Nugent, Rachel, eds. Diabetes: An Update on the Pandemic and Potential Solutions
 Sun, Hong; Saeedi, Pouya; Karuranga, Suvi; Pinkepank, Moritz; Ogurtsova, Katherine; Duncan, Bruce B.; Stein, Caroline; Basit, Abdul; Chan, Juliana C. N.; Mbanya, Jean Claude; Pavkov, Meda E.; Ramachandaran, Ambady; Wild, Sarah H.; James, Steven; Herman, William H: IDF Diabetes Atlas: Global, regional and country-level diabetes prevalence estimates for 2021 and projections for 2045
 Mbanya, Jean Claude; Motala, Ayesha A; Sobngwi, Eugene; Assah, Felix K; Enoru, Sostanie: Diabetes in sub-Saharan Africa
 Sobngwi, E.; Mbanya, J.-C. N.; Unwin, N. C.; Kengne, A. P.; Fezeu, L.; Minkoulou, E. M.; Aspray, T. J.; Alberti, Kgmm: Physical activity and its relationship with obesity, hypertension and diabetes in urban and rural Cameroon
 Fisher, Edwin B.; Boothroyd, Renée I.; Coufal, Muchieh Maggy; Baumann, Linda C.; Mbanya, Jean Claude; Rotheram-Borus, Mary Jane; Sanguanprasit, Boosaba; Tanasugarn, Chanuantong: Peer Support For Self-Management Of Diabetes Improved Outcomes In International Settings

References 

Living people
Year of birth missing (living people)
Cameroonian physicians
Cameroonian academics
Cameroonian scientists
Alumni of Newcastle University
Fellows of the Royal College of Physicians
Diabetologists
People from Yaoundé
Academic staff of the University of Yaoundé